Juha Toivonen (born June 10, 1987) is a Finnish ice hockey goaltender. His is currently an Unrestricted Free Agent who most recently played with Mikkelin Jukurit in the Finnish Mestis.

Toivonen made his SM-liiga debut playing with HPK during the 2005–06 SM-liiga season.

References

External links

1987 births
Living people
Finnish ice hockey goaltenders
KalPa players
Hokki players
HPK players
Mikkelin Jukurit players
SaPKo players
People from Hattula
Sportspeople from Kanta-Häme